Caccianemici is an Italian surname. Notable people with the surname include:

Francesco Caccianemici, Italian Renaissance painter
Gerardo Caccianemici (disambiguation)
Ubaldo Caccianemici (died 1171), Italian cardinal and cardinal-nephew of Pope Lucius II
Vicenzo Caccianemici, Italian Renaissance painter

Italian-language surnames